Herbert Vigran (June 5, 1910 – November 29, 1986) was an American character actor in Hollywood from the 1930s to the 1980s. Over his 50-year career, he made over 350 television and film appearances.

Early years
Vigran was a native of Cincinnati, but his family moved to Fort Wayne, Indiana, when he was 16. He graduated with an LL.B. degree from Indiana University, but later chose to pursue acting.

Stage
Billed as Herbert Vigran, he appeared on Broadway in three plays from 1935 through 1938.

Radio
After starting out on Broadway, Vigran soon moved to Hollywood with no money and only the Broadway acting experience. In 1939, Vigran's agent helped him secure a lead in the radio drama Silver Theatre.  The actor had a $5 recording made of the radio show and used it as a demo to get other jobs with his unique voice.  He performed in radio shows with the likes of Jack Benny,  Bob Hope, Lucille Ball and Jimmy Durante.

Television
He later had hundreds of television appearances on shows like Adventures of Superman (six episodes), Dragnet (eleven episodes), The Adventures of Ozzie and Harriet (seven episodes), The Dick Van Dyke Show (three episodes), Perry Mason (two episodes), Dragnet 1967 (seven episodes), Petticoat Junction (one episode, 1969), and The Brady Bunch (two episodes). Vigran had a recurring role as Judge Brooker in Gunsmoke between 1970 and 1975.  He appeared in four I Love Lucy episodes, and in the 1954 episode titled "Lucy Is Envious", Vigran is the promoter who hired Lucy and Ethel to dress up as "Women from Mars" for a publicity stunt.  With his bushy eyebrows and balding pate, he was easily cast in a wide variety of middle-aged "everyman" roles: cops, small-time crooks, judges, jurors, bartenders, repairmen, neighbors, shopkeepers, etc.

Film
Vigran had a small but significant role in Charlie Chaplin's Monsieur Verdoux (1947) as a reporter who interviews Chaplin as the title character while he is awaiting execution, while 1954's White Christmas starring Bing Crosby and Danny Kaye saw Vigran in the role of Novello, a nightclub owner who ushers in the stars to see his floor show attraction, The Haines Sisters.

In the rock and roll movie Go, Johnny, Go (1959), Vigran played an assistant to promoter Alan Freed and performed dialogue scenes with rock musician Chuck Berry.  He also provided the voice of "Whitney's boss" in a series of Arrowhead bottled water commercials for television and radio in the 1960s.

Personal life
In 1952, Vigran married Belle Pasternack. The couple had two sons.

Vigran was active up until his death.

Death
Vigran died of complications from cancer at the age of 76 at Cedars-Sinai Medical Center in Los Angeles. He was cremated.

Stage, radio, television, and film appearances

Theater

Radio

Television

Films

Further reading

Notes

References

External links

 
 
 

1910 births
1986 deaths
American male film actors
American male radio actors
American male television actors
Male actors from Indiana
Indiana University alumni
Male actors from Chicago
American male voice actors
Male actors from Cincinnati
Male actors from Los Angeles
20th-century American male actors
Jewish American male actors
20th-century American Jews
Deaths from cancer in California